Villa del Campo may refer to:
 Villa del Campo, Baja California, Mexico
 Villa del Campo, Cáceres, Spain